The Shield Around the K: The Story of K Records is a 2000 documentary produced and directed by Heather Rose Dominic about the independent record label, K Records.  The film profiles the birth and growth of the punk rock DIY label based in Olympia, Washington.

Co-founders, Calvin Johnson and Candice Pedersen are interviewed along with over 20 K artists and peers including Michael Azerrad, Timothy Brock, Gerard Cosloy, The Crabs, Steve Fisk, John Foster, John Goodmanson, Toni Holm, Rich Jensen, Peter Kember, David Lester, Bret Lunsford, Ian MacKaye, Lois Maffeo, Patrick Maley, Rose Melberg, Slim Moon, Jack Rabid, David Raugh, Ira Robbins, Jean Smith, Winston Vidor, Wandering Lucy and Dean Wareham.

Included are Super 8 music videos of Beat Happening, The Halo Benders, Lois, Mecca Normal and Tiger Trap directed by Patrick Maley and Lois Maffeo.  The film also contains rare footage from the International Pop Underground Convention, a six-day festival held at the Capital Theater in Olympia, Washington in August, 1991.

Production 
The film was shot using a Panasonic PV-810 camera.

The majority of the film's footage was captured over two weeks in the Pacific Northwest.  Interviews and locations were shot in Anacortes, Washington; New York, New York; Olympia, Washington; Philadelphia, Pennsylvania; Portland, Oregon; Seattle, Washington; Vancouver, British Columbia; Vancouver, Washington and Washington, D.C.

DVD special features 
IPU Footage
Beat Happening: Cast a Shadow
Beat Happening: Revolution Come & Gone
Mecca Normal: He Didn't Say
Mecca Normal: Walk Alone

Reception 
The film played to a sold-out audience at the 2000 New York Underground Film Festival and went on to receive invitational screenings at over 20 film festivals in Canada, England, Germany, Sweden and the United States.

The Shield Around the K garnered favorable reviews from over 50 national and international publications including Spin, Jane, Record Collector, and Time Out New York.

The film was referenced in Our Band Could Be Your Life: Scenes from the American Indie Underground, 1981-1991 written by Michael Azerrad and published by Little, Brown and Company, 2001.

References

External links 
The Shield Around the K at the Internet Movie Database
The Shield Around the K at Allmovie
DVDTalk Review
Philadelphia City Paper Review
Heather Rose Dominic Interview
Heather Rose Dominic Interview

2000 films
American independent films
Documentary films about punk music and musicians
American documentary films
2000s English-language films
2000s American films